The Medical Mission Sisters (MMS) is a religious congregation of women in the Roman Catholic Church. It was founded in September 1925 with a goal of providing the poor of the world better access to health care. They were formerly known as the "Society of the Catholic Medical Missions."

History
The MMS congregation grew out of the experiences of Dr. Anna Dengel, who is originally from Austria. Dr. Dengel has served as a medical missionary to the poor of what was then Northern India (modern-day Pakistan) for several years. After months of traveling and giving talks about the conditions in India, and speaking with many members of the clergy, Dr. Dengel became convinced that only a group of Religious Sisters who had been professionally trained as physicians could reach these women. Such a project, however, was contrary to the canon law of the time, since it prohibited members of religious institutes from practicing medicine.

Nevertheless, she drew up a Constitution for the Community she had in mind. She wrote that the members were “to live for God...to dedicate themselves to the service of the sick for the love of God and...to be properly trained according to the knowledge and standards of the time in order to practice medicine in its full scope, to which the Sisters were to dedicate their lives”.

Permission was granted on June 12, 1925, to begin the new Congregation and, on September 30, 1925, the “First Four”—Dr. Anna Dengel of Austria, Dr. Johanna Lyons of Chicago, Evelyn Flieger, R.N., originally from Britain, and Marie Ulbrich, R.N., of Luxemburg, Iowa—came together in Washington, D.C. to begin the Medical Mission Sisters.

The “First Four” were unable to profess religious vows officially because the Catholic Church had yet to approve Sisters working in the medical field, yet they lived as professed Sisters just the same. In 1935, the Catholic Church changed its regulations and approved Sisters’ working in medicine and all of its branches. The Medical Mission Sisters then made their public, canonical vows, and they began to establish communities around the world.

Music
The North American headquarters for the Congregation was established in Philadelphia, Pennsylvania in 1964 when, like The Singing Nun (Soeur Sourire) had done a year earlier - the Sisters began singing their own homegrown brand of spiritually-themed folk music as an aide to the medical health and wellness they professed.

In 1965 one of the most prolific of these composers, Sister Miriam Therese Winter had composed what would become a Grammy-award-winning worldwide hit Joy is Like the Rain. Response was so strong to the song that other songs were written and a marathon eight-hour recording session was commissioned in Philadelphia in early 1966, at which this song was recorded along with dozens of others which would make up their first five albums.

Beginnings of international hospitals
In 1965, at the request of the Roman Catholic Archdiocese of Addis Ababa in Ethiopia, Mother Anna made a visit to that nation to investigate the possibilities of starting a hospital for the people of that nation. Two Medical Mission Sisters arrived in Ethiopia in 1967 to start the groundwork for this mission. A few more Sisters came in 1969, and their work was able to begin. As of 2008, there were a dozen Sisters serving there, both foreigners and native Ethiopians.

Current status
As of 2010, there are about 600 Sisters in the congregation, serving in 17 nations around the globe. The Sisters in the Congregation today come from 23 nations.

The Sisters serve through health care and education, wholeness and wellness programs, the development of women, work for justice, worship and spirituality, and music and song. They have 80 Associates, women and men of many nations who share their values and have committed themselves to live the mission of the Society, which is "to be a healing presence at the heart of a wounded world."

As examples of the range of services the Sisters do in different countries: 
In India, the Sisters run the Center for Healing and Integration, to train the people low to get low-cost health care through natural resources.
In Pasco County, Florida, they run a community-based program to connect the unemployed with potential employers.
A Learning Center for Ecological Spirituality was established in Udenhout, the Netherlands.
Sr. Margaret McKenna runs a drug recover center.
Medical Mission Sisters have worked as course instructors since its inception at the Holy Cross - Centre for Christian Meditation and Spirituality in the Holy Cross Church in Frankfurt-Bornheim.

See also
Anna Dengel
Miriam Therese Winter
Monika Hellwig

References

Catholic female orders and societies
Christian organizations established in 1925
Catholic missionary orders
Catholic religious institutes established in the 20th century
Catholic nursing orders
Christian medical missionaries